Deh-e Mirza (also Romanized as Deh-e Mīrzā and Deh Mīrzā) is a village in Rayen Rural District, Rayen District, Kerman County, Kerman Province, Iran. At the 2006 census, its population was 169, in 44 families.

References 

Populated places in Kerman County